The Air Force Falcons football team competes in the National Collegiate Athletic Association (NCAA) Division I Football Bowl Subdivision, representing the United States Air Force Academy. Since 1999, the Falcons have competed as a charter member of the Mountain West Conference.

Overall, Air Force has participated in 27 bowl games, and has a 13–13–1 all-time postseason record. The first Air Force bowl game was the 1959 Cotton Bowl, a 0–0 tie with TCU. This was one of two major bowls Air Force has played in, the other being a 34–13 loss to Tennessee in the 1971 Sugar Bowl. The team regularly participated in bowl games in the late 1980s and throughout the 1990s, as coach Fisher DeBerry led the team to 12 bowl games between 1984 and 2002. Current coach Troy Calhoun has led the team to nine bowl games since 2007, with a 45–24 win over South Alabama in the 2016 Arizona Bowl being the latest bowl game for Air Force. The bowl games most frequented by Air Force has been the Armed Forces Bowl, with five total appearances (including three straight from 2007–2009), followed by the Liberty Bowl (four straight from 1989–1992).

Key

Bowl games

References

Lists of college bowl games by team

Colorado sports-related lists